Eupithecia galepsa is a moth in the  family Geometridae. It is found in Bolivia.

References

Moths described in 1987
galepsa
Moths of South America